The 2014–15 LEN Champions League was the 52nd edition of LEN's premier competition for men's water polo clubs. It ran from 26 September 2014 to 30 May 2015, and it is contested by 26 teams from 13 countries. The Final Six (quarterfinals, semifinals, final, and third place game) took place on May 28 and May 30 in Barcelona.

Overview

Team allocation

8 teams are directly qualified for the preliminary round.

Round and draw dates
The schedule of the competition is as follows.

Qualifying rounds

Qualification round I
26-28 September 
Twelve teams will take part in the Qualification round I. They will be drawn into two groups of six teams, whose played on 26–28 September 2014. Top 5 teams of each group advance to qualification round II. Teams finishing 6th continue in 2014–15 LEN Euro Cup qualification.

Group A
CN Marseille has the right to organize the tournament.

Group B
Jadran Herceg Novi has the right to organize the tournament.

Qualification round II
 17–19 October
Sixteen teams will take part in the Qualification round II. These clubs will form four groups of four and will have round robin tournaments at four host cities on 17–19 October. Top 2 of these groups advance to play-off (qualification round 3), Teams finishing 3rd, 4th continue in 2014–15 LEN Euro Cup qualification.

Group C
Waspo Hannover has the right to organize the tournament.

Group D
Orvosegyetem SC has the right to organize the tournament.

Group E
HAVK Mladost has the right to organize the tournament.

Group F
Radnički Kragujevac has the right to organize the tournament.

Qualification round III
29 October 2014 1st match
12 November 2014 2nd match

Eight teams will take part in the Qualification round III. These teams played against each other over two legs on a home-and-away basis. The mechanism of the draws for each round was as follow:
In the draw for the Qualification round III, the four group winners were seeded, and the four group runners-up were unseeded. The seeded teams were drawn against the unseeded teams, with the seeded teams hosting the second leg. Teams from the same group could not be drawn against each other.
The first legs were played on 29 October, and the second legs were played on 12 November 2014.

Preliminary round

The regular season was played between 29 November 2014 and 2 May 2015.
If teams are level on record at the end of the preliminary round, tiebreakers are applied in the following order:

 Head-to-head record.
 Head-to-head point differential.
 Point differential during the Regular Season.
 Points scored during the regular season.
 Sum of quotients of points scored and points allowed in each Regular Season match.

In each group, teams played against each other home-and-away in a round-robin format. The matchdays were 29 November, 17 December 2014, 14 January, 28 January, 11 February, 4 March, 25 March, 8 April, 18 April, and 2 May 2015. The top three teams advanced to the final six.

The Final Six (quarterfinals, semifinals, third place game and final) will be played in Barcelona, Spain from 28 to 30 May 2015.

Group A

Group B

Final Six (Barcelona)
Piscines Bernat Picornell, Barcelona, Spain

Quarter-finals

5th place

Semi-finals

Third place

Final

Final standings

Awards

See also
2014–15 LEN Euro Cup

References

External links
LEN Champions League (official website)

 
LEN Champions League seasons
Champions League
2014 in water polo
2015 in water polo